Nicholas von Tunzelmann (also known as Nicholas Paul Balthasar Tunzelmann von Alderflug or Paul Nicholai Balthasar Tunzelmann von Alderflug, with his surnames often Anglicised as Tunzelman, 1828 – 31 July 1900) is famous as one of the first two European explorers to explore Lake Wakatipu and the site of the future town of Queenstown, New Zealand in 1860. He and fellow explorer William Gilbert Rees were the first Europeans to settle the Wakatipu Basin.

Tunzelmann was born on the island of Ösel, Livonia, in the Baltic Sea (present day Estonia). He studied in Germany, Switzerland, and England. He studied medicine in Canada then London, but decided to go to India in the cavalry service as a veterinary surgeon, and studied at the Royal Veterinary College. He was naturalised in England at the age of 21.

He came to New Zealand in 1858. He married Gertrude Rose Gilbert. She was the sister of Frances Rebecca Gilbert, who married William Rees.

He established a high country farm at Mount Nicholas on the western side of Lake Wakatipu (i.e. opposite Queenstown). Business partners were his brother-in-law (Pickett) and a Wellington sheep farmer (Edward Pharazyn, a son of Charles Johnson Pharazyn). Pharazyn pulled out of the partnership when 1,500 of the 2,000 sheep bought by him in Melbourne died on the journey. Tunzelmann had bad luck over land regulations and lost all his capital. Encouraged by his sister, he tried fruit farming in New South Wales, Australia for five years before returning when he heard his 100-acre section at Lake Wakatipu might be lost.

He died in Frankton Hospital on 31 July 1900. His wife died on 21 April 1918. She was survived by two sons and three daughters.

The Von River, Von Valley, and Mount Nicholas—all located on his station adjacent to Lake Wakatipu—are named after him.

References

1828 births
1900 deaths
Settlers of New Zealand
Settlers of Otago
Queenstown, New Zealand